Alf Latta (1882-1947)  was an Australian rugby league footballer who played in the 1900s and 1910s.  He played for Balmain and was a foundation player of the club.

Playing career
Latta made his first grade debut for Balmain against Western Suburbs on 20 April 1908 at Birchgrove Oval, which was the club's first ever game and also the opening week of the inaugural NSWRL competition.  Balmain went on to win the match 24–0 in front of 3000 spectators.  Latta scored Balmain's first ever try as a club and also kicked the club's first goals during the game.

Latta played with Balmain up until the end of the 1912 before retiring with his last game being an 8–5 loss against Annandale.

Latta played representative football for New South Wales in 1909 and played 2 games for Metropolis scoring 3 tries

Latta's son Ernie also went to play for Balmain in 1935.

References

1882 births
1947 deaths
Australian rugby league players
Balmain Tigers players
New South Wales rugby league team players
Rugby league players from Sydney
Rugby league centres
Rugby league wingers